Capital punishment was abolished in Turkey in 2004, and no prisoners have been executed since October 1984. The method of execution was hanging.

History
According to Hanz Chiappetta, since the foundation of Turkey in 1923, capital punishment has been carried out 588 times. Prior to 1984, executions would usually happen after military interventions. Adnan Menderes, who served as Prime Minister, was hanged on 17 September 1961 following the 1960 coup d'état, along with two other cabinet members, Fatin Rüştü Zorlu and Hasan Polatkan. Student leaders Deniz Gezmiş, Hüseyin İnan and Yusuf Aslan were hanged on 6 May 1972 after the 1971 military memorandum. Following the 1980 coup d'état, between 1980 and 1984, a total of 50 men, including 27 political activists, were executed by Turkish authorities.

Twenty-four articles of the 1926 Turkish Penal Code (Law 765) provided for a mandatory death penalty, 19 of them for crimes against the state, the government, the Constitution and military, and a further ten for criminal offences like murder and rape. These 24 articles defined a total of 29 offences. 

Under Article 12 of Law 765, death sentences were to be carried out by hanging after being approved by act of the Grand National Assembly of Turkey (Türkiye Büyük Millet Meclisi), or the TBMM. Within the TBMM, they were reviewed by the Judicial Committee before being voted on by parliament as a whole. This decision had to be ratified by the President, who had the power to commute death sentences on grounds of age or ill-health.

By Law 4771 of 9 August 2002 (the 3rd Package for Harmonization with the European Union), the death penalty was abolished for peacetime offences. Law 5218 of 14 July 2004 abolished the death penalty for all times.  Turkey ratified Protocol No. 13 to the European Convention on Human Rights, overseen by the Council of Europe, in February 2006.

Abdullah Ocalan was also sentenced to be executed in June 1999, however Turkey commuted his sentence into imprisonment for life in October 2002.

Since the failed 2016 coup d'état, some politicians have talked about restoring the death penalty. Recep Tayyip Erdoğan, President of Turkey since 2014, announced on 29 October 2016 that the government will present a draft law restoring the death penalty  to the Turkish Parliament ("and I will countersign it").

After his victory in the constitutional referendum in 2017, Erdogan made favorable statements on the reinstatement of capital punishment, announcing he would discuss the possibility with Devlet Bahçeli of the Nationalist Movement Party (MHP) and the then-Turkish prime minister Binali Yıldırım. In view of this happening, the President of the European Commission Jean-Claude Juncker announced that such an event would mean the end of an eventual Turkish accession to the European Union.

Public opinion
A 2011 poll found 65% of people wanted it reinstated for “certain crimes”

In 2019, a ORC survey asked: “Would you support the death penalty for the crimes of child abuse, murder of women and terrorism?” 71.7% of respondents said they would.

Methods
Compared to other countries that use(d) hanging (such as United Kingdom or Japan) with a complex gallows designed to drop the condemned and break the neck, Turkey's gallows were very simple and inexpensive (similar to Iran). People convicted for military crimes were executed by firing squad.

Alternatives
The death sentence was replaced by aggravated life imprisonment (ağırlaştırılmış müebbet hapis cezası). According to Article 9 of Law 5275 on the Execution of Sentences these prisoners are held in individual cells in high security prisons and are allowed to exercise in a neighbouring yard one hour per day.

References

Turkey
Turkey
Death in Turkey
Human rights abuses in Turkey
2004 disestablishments in Turkey
Recep Tayyip Erdoğan controversies